In music, Op. 50 stands for Opus number 50. Compositions that are assigned this number include:

 Beethoven – Romance for violin and orchestra no. 2 Op. 50
 Brahms – Rinaldo
 Braunfels – Der Traum ein Leben
 Britten – Billy Budd
 Chopin – Mazurkas, Op. 50
 Eisler – Deutsche Sinfonie
 Elgar – In the South (Alassio)
 Fauré – Pavane
 Haydn – String Quartets, Op. 50
 Hindemith – Konzertmusik for Brass and String Orchestra
 Holst – The Wandering Scholar
 Kabalevsky – Piano Concerto No. 3
 Kienzl – Don Quixote
 Krenek – Das geheime Königreich
 Myaskovsky – Symphony No. 20
 Nielsen – Symphony No. 5
 Prokofiev – String Quartet No. 1
 Schumann – Paradise and the Peri
 Strauss – Feuersnot
 Strauss – Klange aus der Walachei
 Tchaikovsky – Piano Trio
 Villa-Lobos – Cello Concerto No. 1
 Waterhouse – Bei Nacht